The transmembrane cation channel superfamily was defined in InterPro and Pfam as the family of tetrameric ion channels. These include the sodium, potassium, calcium, ryanodine receptor, HCN, CNG, CatSper, and TRP channels.

They are described as minimally having two transmembrane helices flanking a loop which determines the ion selectivity of the channel pore. Many eukaryotic channels have four additional transmembrane helices (TM), related to or vestigial of voltage gating. The proteins with only two transmembrane helices are most commonly found in bacteria. This also includes the 2-TM inward-rectifier potassium channels  found primarily in eukaryotes. There are commonly additional regulatory domains which serve to regulate ion conduction and channel gating. The pores may also be homotetramers or heterotetramers; where heterotetramers may be encoded as distinct genes or as multiple pore domains within a single polypeptide. The HVCN1 and Putative tyrosine-protein phosphatase proteins do not contain an expected ion conduction pore domain, but rather have homology only to the voltage sensor domain of voltage gated ion channels.

Human channels with 6 TM helices

Cation

Transient receptor potential

Canonical 

 TRPC1; TRPC3; TRPC4; TRPC5; TRPC6; TRPC7

Melastatin 

 TRPM1; TRPM2; TRPM3; TRPM4; TRPM5; TRPM6; TRPM7; TRPM8

Vanilloid 

 TRPV1; TRPV2; TRPV3; TRPV4; TRPV5; TRPV6

Mucolipin 

 MCOLN1; MCOLN2; MCOLN3;

Ankyrin 

 TRPA1

TRPP 

 PKD1L3;

Calcium

Voltage-dependent 

 CACNA1A; CACNA1B; CACNA1C; CACNA1D; CACNA1E; CACNA1F; CACNA1G; CACNA1H; CACNA1I; CACNA1S

Sperm 

 CATSPER1; CATSPER2; CATSPER3; CATSPER4

Ryanodine receptor 

 RYR1; RYR2; RYR3

Potassium

Voltage-gated potassium

Delayed rectifier 
Kvα1.x - Shaker-related: Kv1.1 (KCNA1), Kv1.2 (KCNA2), Kv1.3 (KCNA3), Kv1.5 (KCNA5), Kv1.6 (KCNA6), Kv1.7 (KCNA7), Kv1.8 (KCNA10)
Kvα2.x - Shab-related: Kv2.1 (KCNB1), Kv2.2 (KCNB2)
Kvα3.x - Shaw-related: Kv3.1 (KCNC1), Kv3.2 (KCNC2)
Kvα7.x: Kv7.1 (KCNQ1) - KvLQT1, Kv7.2 (KCNQ2), Kv7.3 (KCNQ3), Kv7.4 (KCNQ4), Kv7.5 (KCNQ5) 
Kvα10.x: Kv10.1 (KCNH1)

A-type potassium 
Kvα1.x - Shaker-related: Kv1.4 (KCNA4)
Kvα3.x - Shaw-related: Kv3.3 (KCNC3), Kv3.4 (KCNC4)
Kvα4.x - Shal-related: Kv4.1 (KCND1), Kv4.2 (KCND2), Kv4.3 (KCND3)

Outward-rectifying 
Kvα10.x: Kv10.2 (KCNH5)

Inwardly-rectifying 
Kvα11.x - ether-a-go-go potassium channels: Kv11.1 (KCNH2) - hERG, Kv11.2 (KCNH6), Kv11.3 (KCNH7)

Slowly activating 
Kvα12.x: Kv12.1 (KCNH8), Kv12.2 (KCNH3), Kv12.3 (KCNH4)

Modifier/silencer 
Kvα5.x: Kv5.1 (KCNF1)
Kvα6.x: Kv6.1 (KCNG1), Kv6.2 (KCNG2), Kv6.3 (KCNG3), Kv6.4 (KCNG4)
Kvα8.x: Kv8.1 (KCNV1), Kv8.2 (KCNV2)
Kvα9.x: Kv9.1 (KCNS1), Kv9.2 (KCNS2), Kv9.3 (KCNS3)

Calcium-activated

BK 

 KCa1.1 (BK, Slo1, Maxi-K)

SK 

 KCa2.x: KCa2.1 (KCNN1) - SK1, KCa2.2 (KCNN2) - SK2, KCa2.3 (KCNN3) - SK3
 KCa3.x: KCa3.1 (KCNN4) - SK4 
 KCa4.x: KCa4.1 (KCNT1) -  SLACK, KCa4.2 (KCNT2) - SLICK

IK 

KCa3.1 (IKCa1, SK4)

Other subfamilies 
 KCa5.1 (Slo3)

Inward-rectifier potassium

Sodium
 NALCN 
 SCN1A; SCN2A; SCN2A2; SCN3A; SCN4A; SCN5A; SCN7A; SCN8A; SCN9A; SCN10A; SCN11A
 SLC9A10; SLC9A11

Cyclic nucleotide-gated
 CNGA1; CNGA2; CNGA3; CNGA4
 CNGB1; CNGB3
 HCN1; HCN2; HCN3; HCN4
 ITPR1; ITPR2; ITPR3

Proton
 HVCN1

Related proteins
 TPTE, part of the larger Voltage sensitive phosphatase family

Human channels with 2 TM helices in each subunit

Potassium

Tandem pore domain potassium channel

 KCNK1; KCNK2; KCNK3; KCNK4; KCNK5; KCNK6; KCNK7; KCNK9; KCNK10; KCNK12; KCNK13; KCNK15; KCNK16; KCNK17; KCNK18

Non-human channels

Two-pore 

 TPCN1
 TPCN2

Pore-only potassium 

 KcsA

Ligand-gated potassium 
 GluR0

Voltage-gated potassium 

 KvAP

Prokaryotic KCa 

 Kch 
 MthK 
 TrkA/TrkH 
 KtrAB 
 GsuK 
 TM1088

Voltage and cyclic nucleotide gated potassium 
 MlotiK1

Sodium 
 NaChBac 
 NaVAb 
 NaVAe1 
 NaVAp 
 NaVMm

Non-selective 
 NaK

Prokaryotic inward-rectifier potassium 

 KirBac

Engineered 
 NaK2CNG 
 NaK2K

References

External links 
 

Protein domains
Protein families
Transmembrane proteins
Ion channels